America Goes Over was a silent documentary propaganda film produced by the US Army Signal Corp in 1918, documenting the activities of the American Expeditionary Forces in World War I under General John J. Pershing. The movie was a product of the Division of Films of the Committee on Public Information, the Washington, DC-based federal agency in charge of wartime propaganda in the United States.

Plot
The film opens with footage of the war prior to America's entry, including many areas where the US never became involved, such as the Italian Front and the conquest of Palestine. The lead-up to America's entry is covered with President Woodrow Wilson warning the Germans about unrestricted submarine warfare.

From that point on, the film takes the viewer to the front line of the Western Front during the final months of the Great War. In between the usual combat footage, which is considerable, there are many "human interest" clips about doughboys on KP, using slop buckets, digging trenches, even one of their lion mascot. Those shots are accompanied by a still cartoon soldier resembling Private SNAFU.

The combat footage, which includes some graphic scenes of the dead and wounded, is accompanied by animated maps of the front, and the gradual inching toward Germany.

External links
 US Army Signal Corp, America Goes Over. Washington, DC: Division of Films, Committee on Public Information, 1918. - Part I | Part II | Part III | Part IV | Part V

American World War I propaganda films
Western Front (World War I) films
1918 films
American black-and-white films
American silent feature films
American documentary films
1918 documentary films
1910s American films
Silent war films
1910s English-language films